Doljingiin Adyaatömör (born March 10, 1945) is a Mongolian wrestler.

Adyaatömör participated in the 1976 Summer Olympics in Montreal. He lost both his matches in super-heavyweight against Ladislau Simon in first and Moslem Eskandar-Filabi in third round. (In second round he had a bye). He finished as one of three ninth placed.

References

1945 births
Living people
Olympic wrestlers of Mongolia
Wrestlers at the 1976 Summer Olympics
Mongolian male sport wrestlers
Asian Games bronze medalists for Mongolia
Asian Games medalists in wrestling
Wrestlers at the 1974 Asian Games
Medalists at the 1974 Asian Games